The Communist Party of Bohemia and Moravia (KSČM) held a leadership election on 21 April 2018. Snap election was held as a result of party's losses in 2017 legislative election. Josef Skála was first major candidate to announce his candidacy. The incumbent leader Vojtěch Filip decided to run for another term. MEP Kateřina Konečná became third major candidate. Filip and Skála eventually advanced to second round.

Filip won the election and was elected for another four years.

Background
KSČM received only 8% in 2017 legislative election and was reduced to 15 seats. Josef Skála the leader of inner-party's opposition called for the resignation of the incumbent leader Vojtěch Filip. It was announced that snap election would be held in April 2018. Filip decided to not seek reelection. Skála announced he will run if he receives support in regions.

In November 2017, conflict within the party started. Radical wing represented by Skála attacked moderate wing led by Jiří Dolejš. Skála called Dolejš's wing Bourgeoisie opportunists. Dolejš believes that KSČM should modernise party's image.

The incumbent leader Vojtěch Filip eventually decided to seek another term as the leader and announced his candidacy on 27 February 2018. He secured large number of nominations from party's organisations. His candidacy was criticised by many members of the party due to his responsibility for 2017 election result. His main rival Skála was on the other hand criticised for his radical stances. MEP Kateřina Konečná was speculated as a possible third candidate due to her youth and moderate stances. Kateřina Konečná announced her candidacy on 27 March 2018. MPs Leo Luzar and Zdeněk Ondráček also received nominations for the position of leader.

Parlamentní Listy reported on 20 April 2018, that Luzar and Ondráček won't run but will instead support Konečná. 10 people were nominated for the position of leader. Filip, Skála and Konečná are considered only candidates with a real chance to win the position. Filip is considered the front-runner a he received highest number of nominations.

Candidates
Oldřich Duchoň
Vojtěch Filip, the incumbent leader. He previously stated that he won't run but changed his mind. He himself mentioned that he could run if he gets support from regions.
Stanislav Grospič, former Deputy leader of the party.
Ivan Hrůza
Martin Juroška
Kateřina Konečná, MEP. She was speculated as a possible candidate since March 2018. She announced her candidacy on 27 March 2018.
Leo Luzar, MP.
Zdeněk Ondráček, MP.
Daniel Pawlas
Josef Skála, Filip's main opponent in the party. He plans to run for the position. He is considered an orthodox communist.

Declined
Jiří Dolejš, Vice-Chairman. Speculated to be a candidate. 
Filip Zachariáš, Chairman of Vyškov KSČM. He was speculated as a possible rival for Skála.

Opinion polls

Voting
Leo Luzar and Zdeněk Ondráček withdrawn from election early on 21 April 2018 and supported Kateřina Konečná. Stanslav Grospič also withdrawn from election. 315 delegates are allowed to vote. Ivan Hrůza withdrawn from election during his nomination speech and endorsed Skála. Vojtěch Filip and Josef Skála advanced to second round. Filip received 110 votes while Skála 105. Kateřnia Konečná came third with 79 votes. Filip won the second round, with 165 votes to Skála's 143.

References

Communist Party of Bohemia and Moravia leadership elections
Communist Party of Bohemia and Moravia leadership election
Communist Party of Bohemia and Moravia leadership election
Indirect elections
Communist Party of Bohemia and Moravia leadership election
Communist Party of Bohemia and Moravia leadership election